Šimunić is a Croatian surname. Notable people with the surname include:
Anđelka Bego-Šimunić (born 1941), Bosnian-Herzegovinian composer
Boštjan Šimunič (born 1974), Slovenian triple jumper
Josip Šimunić (born 1978), Croatian footballer
Tajana Šimunić Rosing, American computer scientist and computer engineer
Vladimir Šimunić (1919–1993), Croatian footballer

See also
 Šimun
 Simunić

Croatian surnames
Surnames from given names